This list of mayors of Harrisburg, Pennsylvania is sorted chronologically, by default. The current mayor, since January 2022, is Democrat Wanda Williams.

See also
Harrisburg City Council

Notes

References

The Political Graveyard: Harrisburg, Pennsylvania
Dedication of Pennsylvania State Capitol in Harrisburg – Pennsylvania Historical and Museum Commission
History of Harrisburg: the State Capital – Pennsylvania Historical and Museum Commission
History of the Counties of Dauphin and Lebanon